Frigidoalvania pelagica, common name the carinate alvania, is a species of minute sea snail, a marine gastropod mollusk or micromollusk in the family Rissoidae.

Distribution

Description 
The maximum recorded shell length is 3 mm.

Habitat 
Minimum recorded depth is 13 m. Maximum recorded depth is 808 m.

References

Rissoidae
Gastropods described in 1851